Storo is a commune in Trento, Italy.

Storo may also refer to:
Storo (Greenland), an island in Greenland
Storo, Norway, a neighborhood in Oslo, Norway
Storo station
, a Swedish tanker 1956–59, earlier MV Kollbjørg

See also

Storön, name of a number of islands in Sweden